Beetroot is the fourth album by the English band Cast, released on 30 July 2001. From the album, a single was released, "Desert Drought", which reached #45 in the UK Singles Chart.  Two further intended singles, "Kingdoms And Crowns" and "Giving It All Away" were cancelled due to the album and first single's poor sales.

Background 
In the run up to the album's release, the band ran a competition via their then-official website, appealing to fans to submit their own ideas for possible album titles, as the band proposed that they would choose a title from all of the entries received.  However, despite the many suggestions, John ultimately decided to stick with his own working title for the project, 'Beetroot'.

Although the band chose not to use any of the names suggested, they did make a Top 10 list of alternate album titles:

 '4Cast'
 'All of Us Are'
 'Out From Within'
 'Pyramid'
 'Recreativity'
 'Reflector'
 'Sense & Sensemilia'
 'So It Goes'
 'Spirit Level'
 'What Remains To Be Discovered?'

Reception

In a retrospective review, Jamie Atkins of Record Collector said the album and its predecessor showcase a band attempting to "break new ground," while Beetroot "in particular containing their most adventurous work [...] It all just lacks wit, imagination and conviction".

Track listing 
All songs written by John Power.
 "Desert Drought" – 2:47
 "Heal Me" – 1:36
 "Curtains" – 3:25
 "Kingdoms and Crowns" – 3:41
 "Giving It All Away" – 4:17
 "Lose Myself" – 4:09
 "I Never Can Say" – 4:31
 "High Wire" – 3:56
 "Meditations" – 3:49
 "JetSteam" – 4:32
 "U-Turn" – 3:12
 "Universal Grinding Wheel" – 3:59

Personnel 
Cast
 John Power – vocals, guitar, backing vocals, producer, mixing, arrangements
 Peter Wilkinson – bass, backing vocals
 Liam "Skin" Tyson – guitar, backing vocals
 Keith O'Neill – drums, percussion, backing vocals

Production
 Tristin Norwell – producer, engineer, mixing, arrangements
 Simon B. Sheridan – engineer
 Claire Lewis – assistant engineer
 Damon Iddins – assistant engineer
 Adrian Hall – assistant engineer
 The Weathermen – Pro Tools operator
 Lawrence Johnson – additional vocal arrangements
 Kevin Metcalfe – mastering

Additional musicians
 Lurine Cato – backing vocals
 Michelle John – backing vocals
 Rachel McFarlane – backing vocals
 David Farmer – brass
 David Vines – brass
 David Williamson – brass
 James Watson – brass
 Richard Brown – brass
 Tom Edwards – brass
 Tom Watson – brass
 William Watson – brass
 Paul Ellison – piano, flute

Additional personnel
 Matthew Sankey – design
 Barry Dawson – photography
 Martyn Goodacre – photography
 Brian Cannon – photography

Chart performance

References

External links 
 Beetroot at Billboard 

Cast (band) albums
2001 albums
Polydor Records albums